Radio City 107.3 is a Swedish radio station.

The station was launched in 1987 in Gothenburg, Sweden, on the West Coast of Sweden. Since broadcasting began, the station has developed a format and music concept tailor-made for the listeners in Gothenburg. Radio City 107.3 is owned by ProSiebenSat.1 Media AG.

The target group is 20 to 40-year-old listeners. In the area of coverage, the radio competes with four commercial stations, four government channels and at least five community frequencies.

The station's local approach is reflected in all of its programming - from the most popular music in Gothenburg, "100% Gothenburg – 100% Hits" to the locally produced news broadcasts and traffic information, the editorial coverage of local events and the building of strong and well-known on-air personalities. It is the biggest commercial radio station in Sweden.

In 2006, Radio City 107,3 and Mix Megapol were amalgamated. The new name of the station was Mix Megapol Radio City with "Gothenburg's best mix of music"

Radio stations in Sweden
ProSiebenSat.1 Media
Mass media in Gothenburg